The Fire Cat is a 1921 American silent drama film directed by Norman Dawn and starring Edith Roberts, Walter Long, Eagle Eye, Olga D. Mojean, and Beatrice Dominguez. The film was released by Universal Film Manufacturing Company in February 1921.

Cast
Edith Roberts as Dulce
Walter Long as Gringo Burke
Eagle Eye as Cholo Pete (credited as William Eagle Eye)
Olga D. Mojean as Mother Alvarez
Beatrice Dominguez as Margarita
Arthur Jasmine as Pancho
Wallace MacDonald as David Ross

Preservation
The film is now considered lost.

References

External links

1921 drama films
Silent American drama films
American silent feature films
American black-and-white films
Universal Pictures films
Lost American films
1921 lost films
Lost drama films
Films directed by Norman Dawn
1920s American films